Rajčević is a Serbian surname. Notable people with the surname include:

Aleksander Rajčević (born 1986), Slovenian football defender
Slobodan Rajčević (born 1985), Serbian futsal player
Simonida Rajčević (born 1974), Serbian painter and artist
Ana Rajcevic, Serbian fashion artist
 Milorad Rajčević (1890-1964), Serbian globetrotter and writer.

See also
Raičević, a surname
Rajčevce, a settlement in Serbia

Serbian surnames